Jason Spevack (born July 4, 1997) is a Canadian actor and filmmaker. He is a graduate of The London School of Economics. He has dual citizenship with Canada and the United States. Spevack has appeared in over 40 commercials for radio and television and had a principal role in the TV series Dino Dan. He is perhaps best known for his roles in  Fever Pitch, Sunshine Cleaning and Ramona and Beezus, as well as receiving a Young Artist Award nomination as Best Leading Young Actor in a Feature Film for his role in the 2012 comedy film Jesus Henry Christ.

Life and career
He made his debut to the film and television industry in 2003 appearing in three short films entitled The School, Terminal Venus, and Stalker. He then appeared in two television films and the television show Kevin Hill in 2004. In 2005 he appeared in 72 Hours: True Crime, The Life and Hard Times of Guy Terrifico, 1-800-Missing, and Fever Pitch. In 2007, he appeared in Instant Star, ReGenesis, State of Mind, and Rent-a-Goalie. He can also be seen in Sunshine Cleaning as Oscar Lorkowski, a little boy that gets expelled from school, Dino Dan as Dan Henderson, the main character that likes dinosaurs, and Ramona and Beezus as Howie Kemp, Ramona's best friend.

Filmography

Film

Television

Filmmaking

Awards and nominations

References

External links
 
 

1997 births
Living people
American male film actors
Canadian male film actors
American male television actors
Canadian male television actors
American male voice actors
Canadian male voice actors
American people of Canadian descent
Male actors from Toronto